David Alejandro Reano (born 20 March 1984) is a retired Argentine footballer.

Career statistics

Club

Notes

References

External links

David Reano at BDFA.com

1984 births
Living people
Argentine footballers
Argentine expatriate footballers
Association football defenders
Liga I players
Liga II players
Super League Greece players
Maltese Premier League players
Primera Nacional players
Boca Juniors footballers
Aldosivi footballers
Club Almirante Brown footballers
Alumni de Villa María players
ACF Gloria Bistrița players
Veria F.C. players
Naxxar Lions F.C. players
Żebbuġ Rangers F.C. players
Maltese Challenge League players
Argentine expatriate sportspeople in Romania
Expatriate footballers in Romania
Argentine expatriate sportspeople in Greece
Expatriate footballers in Greece
Argentine expatriate sportspeople in Malta
Expatriate footballers in Malta